Garment of Shadows is a 2012 mystery novel by American author Laurie R. King. Twelfth in the Mary Russell series, the story features married detectives Mary Russell and Sherlock Holmes. The events of the novel follow that of Pirate King and feature their old friends, Ali and Mahmoud Hazr (O Jerusalem & Justice Hall).

At the end of 1924, Mary Russell has just finished a stint with Fflytte Films in Morocco but she is not where she should be when her husband, Sherlock Holmes, goes to meet her in Fez. In fact, when she awakens in a strange room she does not know where or who she is, having taken a great blow to the head.

References

External links
 Laurie R. King official website

2012 American novels
Mary Russell (book series)
Sherlock Holmes pastiches
Bantam Books books